Ebru Yazgan (born 18 June 1994) is a Turkish badminton player. In 2015, she was in teams that won the doubles trophy in Ethiopia, Turkey and South Africa.

Achievements

BWF International Challenge/Series 
Women's singles

Women's doubles

  BWF International Challenge tournament
  BWF International Series tournament
  BWF Future Series tournament

References

External links 
 

Living people
1994 births
Turkish female badminton players
20th-century Turkish sportswomen
21st-century Turkish sportswomen